Thokchom Radheshyam Singh is an Indian politician. He was elected to the Manipur Legislative Assembly from Heirok in the 2017 Manipur Legislative Assembly election as a member of the Bharatiya Janata Party. He was the Minister of Education, Labor & Employment in N. Biren Singh cabinet.

He served the country as an IPS officer until he decided to join Politics. As the Labor & Employment Minister of Manipur, he rolled out various skill development programs to resolve the unemployment issues.

References

1964 births
Living people
Manipur MLAs 2022–2027
People from Thoubal district
Manipur MLAs 2017–2022
Bharatiya Janata Party politicians from Manipur